"Apartment" is the debut single by Australian singer Kate Miller-Heidke, released on 2006 as the lead single from Miller-Heike's third EP Circular Breathing. The song was supported by Triple J.

At the inaugural Queensland Music Awards in 2006, the song won Best Pop.

References

2006 debut singles
2006 songs
Kate Miller-Heidke songs
Sony BMG singles